

Overall

Australia vs India

New Zealand vs Zimbabwe

Australia vs Zimbabwe

India vs New Zealand

Zimbabwe vs India

Australia vs New Zealand

India vs Australia

Zimbabwe vs New Zealand

Zimbabwe vs India

Australia vs New Zealand

Australia vs Zimbabwe

New Zealand vs India

External links
 Cricket World Cup 1987 from Cricinfo

1987 Cricket World Cup
1987 in cricket